Peter Sinclair may refer to:

Politics
Peter Sinclair (governor) (born 1934), Rear admiral, first commandant of ADFA, Governor of New South Wales
Peter Sinclair Sr. (1819–1906), Canadian Member of Parliament for Queen's County, 1873–1878
Peter Sinclair Jr. (1887–1938), Canadian Member of Parliament for Queen's, 1935–1938

Others
Peter Sinclair (broadcaster) (1938–2001), New Zealand television personality
Peter J. N. Sinclair (1946–2020), British economist

Peter Sinclair (environmental activist) (born 1953), American climate and environmentalist videographer
Peter Sinclair (footballer) (born 1947), Australian football player
Pete Sinclair (writer), British radio and television writer